Sarah Brayer (born 1957) is an American artist who works in both Japan and the United States. 
She is internationally known for her poured washi paperworks, aquatint and woodblock prints. In 2013 Japan's Ministry of Culture awarded Sarah its Bunkacho Chokan Hyosho ("Commissioner of Culture Award") for dissemination of Japanese culture abroad through her creations in Echizen washi.  She currently resides in Kyoto, Japan and New York, U.S.A.

Sarah Brayer's art is in the collections of the British Museum, the Smithsonian Institution's Sackler Gallery, and the American Embassy in Tokyo.
Brayer was featured at the TED Conference "The Young, the Wise, the Undiscovered" in Tokyo in June 2012.

Arriving in Kyoto Kyoto in 1980, Brayer studied etching with Yoshiko Fukuda and Japanese woodblock printing with Tōshi Yoshida (1911-1996) the son of influential woodblock artist Hiroshi Yoshida (1876-1950). Her interest in color gradation was piqued by the woodblock technique, and she subsequently applied similar gradations to her color aquatints. In 1986 Brayer began making large-scale paperworks in the historic paper village of Imadate, Echizen, Japan.

Influences and early works 

In the 70's Brayer became interested in Japanese aesthetics through the color aquatints of Mary Cassatt, and Raku-style ceramics.
Arriving in Japan in 1979, she studied etching with Yoshiko Fukuda (1937-1986) and Japanese woodblock printing with Toshi Yoshida (1911-1996). In 2007, she was honored as the first western woman artist to have her work on the cover of the CWAJ Print Show catalog, the premier contemporary Japanese print show in Tokyo.

In 1985, Brayer exhibited at the Ronin Gallery in New York, and was reviewed in the NY Times, which noted Day Glow, a large, soft-ground aquatint of Charles Street in New York City that made striking use of Oriental techniques to catch dawn in lower Manhattan.
In 1986 she opened her own print studio in an old kimono weaving factory in Kyoto. That same year she discovered the art of poured washi, and her interest in this technique led her to the historic washi paper center of Echizen in Fukui prefecture. She has been working in the village of Echizen ever since; the only non-Japanese artist who has worked in this 800-year-old village, home to living national treasure paper-makers.  She is also the only westerner to work there continuously.
In 1999, she received a grant from the College Women's Association of Japan (CWAJ), which enabled her to develop a pioneering print technique of using washi Japanese paper as a printing medium.
Brayer's early works were realistic cityscapes and landscapes, figures or pathways through the snow. With continued experimentation, her imagery has become more abstract: the flow of a waterfall, the curve of a wave, or the passage of light through clouds.

Recognitions 

 In 2013 Japan’s Ministry of Culture awarded Sarah its Bunkacho Chokan Hyosho (“Commissioner’s Award”) for dissemination of Japanese culture abroad through her paper creations in Echizen washi.
 Sarah has been recognized in Japan as the first artist ever invited to exhibit at Byodoin Temple, a World Heritage site dating from the Heian period, as part of Kyoto’s 1200-year celebration in 1992.

Collections 
 The Herbert F Johnson Museum of Art: Oceanic Moon (2012 luminescent paperwork mural)
 The British Museum: Sojourn (1995 paperwork scroll), Dayglow (1984 aquatint), River Mist Kyoto (1982 woodblock), Yukata (1987 aquatint)
 The Sackler Gallery, Smithsonian: First Snow (‘91 aquatint), Expanse (‘95 aquatint)
 The Oregon Art Institute: Japanese Bath  (‘86 aquatint)
 Zimmerli Art Museum: City Pearls (‘86 aquatint), City Light (‘85 woodblock print), Yellow Taxi (’93 paperwork/lithograph), Surge (‘95 editioned paperwork)
 Cincinnati Museum: Mankai (‘99 collagraph)
 Rochester Memorial Art Gallery: Mikazuki (’07 aquatint/paperwork), Yellow Taxi (’93 paperwork/lithograph), Spring Rice (‘82 aquatint),
 Cedar Rapids Museum of Art: Hint of Red (‘09 aquatint/paperwork)
 Smith College Museum of Art: Moontrance (‘00 lithograph)
 Shimonoseki Art Museum: Shimonoseki Pearls (’05 paperwork)
 Worcester Art Museum: Taki (’05 aquatint), Kyoto Snowfall (’81 aquatint)
 U.S. State Department: Dayglow (‘84 aquatint)
 U.S. Embassy, Tokyo: Kyoto Snowfall (‘81 aquatint)
 Newark Public Library: City Jewels (’86 aquatint), Moontrance (‘00 lithograph)
 American College Board Collection: Dayglow (‘84 aquatint)
 Johns Hopkins Hospitals: Ruby’s Paradise (‘93 paperwork)
 University Hospitals, Cleveland: Going Places (commissioned mural), Schoolgirls (‘86 aquatint), Schoolboys (‘86 aquatint), Blue Kyoto (‘87 aquatint)
 Citibank, Tokyo: Bather (‘88 lithograph)
 TRW, Los Angeles: Together (‘85 aquatint)
 RJ Reynolds: City Pearls (‘86 aquatint)
 Ozumo, San Francisco: Ryoanji Pools (‘04 paperwork), Source (‘04 paperwork)
 Ozumo, Oakland: Blue Surge (‘04 paperwork), Blue Moon (‘08 paperwork), Katsura Squares (‘08 paperwork)

Solo exhibitions
 2014    The Castellani Museum of Art, Niagara University
 2013    The Verne Gallery, Cleveland, Ohio
 2010    Luminosity: Night Paperworks, Kyoto
 2010    The Ren Brown Collection, Bodega Bay, California
 2010    Art in June, Rochester, New York
 2010    30 Years of Art in Kyoto
 2007    The Ren Brown Collection, Bodega Bay, California
 2007    Gallery Bonten, Shimonoseki, Japan
 2007    Round the Horn, Nantucket
 2006    Whisper to the Moon, Kyoto
 2005    The Ren Brown Collection, Bodega Bay
 2005    Gallery Bonten, Shimonoseki 
 2004    Azuma Gallery, Seattle
 2004    Tokyo American Club
 2004    Esmay Fine Art, Rochester
 2004    Ronin Gallery, New York
 2002    Kato Gallery, Tokyo
 2002    The Tolman Collection, Tokyo
 2001    Hanga Ten, London, England
 2001    Beatrice Royal Gallery, Eastridge, England
 2000    Takashimaya Gallery, Yokohama
 2000    Tokyo American Club
 2000    The Tolman Collection, Tokyo
 1999    The Ren Brown Collection 
 1999    Gallery Bonten, Shimonoseki, Japan
 1998    Gallery Rewdex, Kyoto
 1997    The Tolman Collection, Tokyo
 1997    Ars Locus Gallery, Kyoto
 1996    Ronin Gallery, New York
 1996    Tokyo American Club, Tokyo
 1996    Gallery Bonten, Shimonoseki, Japan
 1995    Dieu Donne Gallery, New York
 1995    WICE Artspace, Paris
 1995    Daimaru Gallery, Osaka, Japan
 1995    Kanda Gallery, Okinawa, Japan
 1994    Takashimaya Gallery, Yokohama, Japan
 1994    Shoestring Gallery, Rochester, New York
 1994    A Sense of Place, The Verne Gallery, Cleveland, Ohio
 1993    Takashimaya Gallery, Tamagawa, Tokyo, Japan
 1993    Tokyo American Club, Tokyo, Japan
 1993    The Ren Brown Collection, Bodega Bay, California
 1993    Galeries Ann Monnet, Kyoto, Japan
 1992    Sarah Brayer at Byodoin Temple  Invitational honoring Kyoto’s 1200th year
 1992    Azuma Gallery, Seattle, Washington
 1992    Gallery Cocteau, Kyoto, Japan
 1992    Shoestring Gallery, Rochester, New York
 1992    Kanda Gallery, Okinawa, Japan
 1991    Recollections: Tokyo American Club
 1991    Takashimaya Gallery, Yokohama
 1991    Daimaru Gallery, Osaka, Japan
 1991    Takashimaya Gallery, Tamagawa, Tokyo
 1990    Connecticut College, New London, Connecticut, Invitational
 1990    Ronin Gallery, New York
 1990    Shoestring Gallery, Rochester, New York
 1989    Kato Gallery, Tokyo
 1989    Gallery Blanche, Osaka
 1989    Kintetsu Gallery, Kyoto
 1989    Tokyo American Club, Tokyo
 1989    Gallery San, Kyoto
 1988    The Museum of Modern Art, Shiga, Japan
 1988    April Sgro-Riddle Gallery, Los Angeles, California
 1988    Daimaru Gallery, Kobe, Japan
 1988    Shukugawa Gallery, Shukugawa, Japan
 1987    Sumi Arts, Hong Kong
 1987    The Japanese Bath and other Landscapes Carter Arcand Gallery, Portland
 1987    Kato Gallery, Kobe, Japan

Selected group exhibitions 
 2018    MOON, the Herbert F. Johnson Museum of Art, Ithaca NY
 2014    Celestial Threads: The Asian Art Museum, San Francisco
 2011    The William J. Dane Fine Print Collection, Newark Public Library
 2009    IMPACT the Big Print, Orange Coast College, Costa Mesa, Cal. Curated by Donna Westerman
 2009    WOOD. METAL. STONE: Contemporary Japanese prints The Flinn Gallery, Greenwich Connecticut
 2007    Catalogue Cover artist and Poster artist, for the 52nd CWAJ Print Show, Tokyo, Japan
 2005    The Color of Night: How Artists Work with Darkness, Zimmerli Art Museum, Rutgers University
 2003    Japan Through Western Eyes, The Morikami Museum, Del Ray Beach, Florida
 2003    Snow in Winter: Ukiyo-e and Contemporary Prints from Japan, The Daiwa Anglo-Japanese Foundation, London
 2003    1853-2003: A Sesquicentennial Salute to Commerce and Cultural Exchange between Japan and the USA, the Newark Public Library, Newark NJ
 2002    Rags to Riches: 25 Years of Paper Art from Dieu Donne Papermill: Milwaukee Art Museum, Milwaukee, Wisconsin. Travelling to Mariana Kistler-Beach Museum of Art and the Heckscher Museum of Art, Huntington, NY
 2001    Rags to Riches: 25 Years of Paper Art from Dieu Donne Papermill, Kresge Art Museum, Michigan; Maryland Institute College of Art
 1999    Miyabi: a Celebration of Beauty by Five American Artists of Kyoto, Sogetsu Museum, Tokyo. Produced by the Tolman Collection
 1997    Across Cultures: Five Contemporary Artists from Japan, Allen Memorial Museum, Oberlin, Ohio
 1995    Out of the Drawing Room, Recent Acquisitions: Works on Paper by Women Artists, The Memorial Art Gallery of the University of Rochester
 1995    Works on Paper  The Verne Collection, New York
 1994    The Verne Collection, Cleveland, Ohio
 1992    Almost a Century after Helen Hyde and Bertha Lum, the Mitzie Verne Collection, Cleveland
 1992    Accent on Paper: 15 Years at the Dieu Donne Papermill  Lintas Worldwide, New York
 1990    Intaglio Printing in the 1980s The Jane Voorhees Zimmerli Art Museum, Rutgers University, New Brunswick, NJ
 1988    Relief Printing in the 1980s The Jane Voorhees Zimmerli Art Museum, Rutgers University. Curated by Trudy Hansen
 1987    Mary Ryan Gallery, New York
 1987    Eight Artists from Kyoto  Takashimaya Gallery, Yokohama
 1987    Prints from the Yoshida Studio, Kabutoya Gallery, Tokyo
 1986    "Curator’s Choice"  Portland Art Institute, Oregon
 1986    Saga Print Annual  New York
 1986    The Bank of Tokyo, Hong Kong
 1986    April Sgro-Riddle Gallery, Los Angeles
 1985    50/50 Monoprints-Prints  Montgomery College
 1984    The Caraccio Collection,  Franklin and Marshall College, Lancaster
 1984    American Painters from Kyoto,  Ronin Gallery, New York
 1984    Foreign Artists in Kyoto  Hankyu Gallery, Senri Osaka
 1982-2014      The College Women’s Association of Japan Print Show  Tokyo
 1998-2014      The New York Print Fair, the Armory, New York City
 1982-2010      Kyoto Etching Association Annual   Kyoto City Art Center

Publications 
 2018	Sarah Brayer: The Complete Prints 1980-2018
 2011	Cover Art, Kyoto Journal, Volume 76
 2009	Cover Art, Kyoto Journal, Volume 73
 2007 	Cover art, 52nd CWAJ Print Show catalog. Tokyo Poster and postcard for CWAJ Print Show, Tokyo. Nick Jones, “Paper Moon” In Touch (TAC magazine), October 2007. Tokyo “Woman By the Sea”cover art, novel in Hebrew by Itai Kohavi, Tel Aviv
 2006	Hand Papermaking summer 2006, noted exhibitions: Sarah Brayer
 2005	April Vollmer, Intersections of  East and West: Contemporary Printmakers in Japan, Contemporary Impressions, Spring 2005. “City Pearls” printed in the Zimmerli Journal 3, Zimmerli Art Museum, 			Rutgers  University of NJ. "Woman By the Sea” cover art for Shakespeare's Will by Vern Thiessen, Canada Playwrights
 2003  Rosemary T. Smith, Japan Through Western Eyes, 1854 to the Present, The Morikami Museum, Del Ray Beach, Florida CWAJ print artists and scholars create a good impression, The Japan Times, October 15, 2003 Kyoto Shimbun, feature article Nov. 11, 2003
 2002	Angela Jeffs, Celebrating “washi” in tune with Kyoto winters, The Japan Times, Nov. 30, 2002 Dai-ichi Seimei Hall,  cover art, The Rubio Quartet and Yoshiko Endo Tokyo American Club magazine “47th Annual Print Show”
 2002  Kyoto Journal, inside art
 2001  Wigmore Hall, cover art, The Rubio Quartet and Yoshiko Endo
 2000  Sarah Brayer, Sarah Brayer  Prints 1980-2000
 1999  Isabel Reynolds,”American artist gets it down on paper, ” The Daily 			Yomiuri,  April 15, 1999 Five American Artist of Kyoto,  Hanga Geijitsu No. 104, Tokyo Japan, p. 111
 1997	Betsy Franco & Michael Verne, Quiet Elegance: Japan Through the Eyes of Nine American Artists Across Cultures: Five Contemporary Western Artists from Japan Allen Memorial Art Museum, Oberlin College Bulletin Number 1 Trudy Hansen, Evolving Forms/Emerging Faces; Trends in Contemporary 			American Printmaking, Zimmerli Art Museum, Rutgers University
 1995	Kyoto Journal, inside cover art, Spring 1995
 1994	“Prints and Paperworks of Sarah Brayer,” Journal of the Print World, Spring 1994. Helen Cullinan, “Prints offer views of Japan,” The Plain Dealer, May 20, 1994. 
1994 Review	Roberto Casin,   “Paper and Color,”  Aboard  magazine, May/June 
 1993	“Post Modern Japanesque,” Kimono,  November 1992 Peter Mallett, “ Papermaking offers Creative, Colorful Medium,” Asahi 	Evening  News, Sept. 5, 1993
 1992	“Culture Portrait,” Photo, January 15, 1992 Journal of the Print World, Almost a Century after Helen Hyde and Bertha Lum, the 	Mitzie Verne Collection, Cleveland
 1991	Stewart Wachs, “Painter’s Career Flourishes in Kyoto,” The Japan Times, Feb. 10, 1991. *review
 1990	Ron Netsky, “Work from Kyoto to Brighton,” Democrat and Chronicle, 			May 20, 1990. *review Zimmerli Art Museum, Intaglio Printing in the 1980s
 1989	cover art  Alan Booth, Tsugaru; Looking for the Lost 
 1988	Zimmerli Art Museum, Relief Printing in the 1980s:  Prints and Blocks from the Rutgers Archives for Printmaking Studios Ron Netsky, “From the Beauty of Kyoto to a Regional Print Show,” Democrat and Chronicle, March 6, 1988. Stewart Wachs, “Painting with liquid paper produces new genre for Brayer,”The Japan Times,  November 21, 1988. *review
 1985	Lawrence Smith, Contemporary Prints From Japan: Symbols of a Society in Transition Grace Glueck,  The New York Times,  March 22, 1985.* review

Lectures and interviews 
 2018  Lecture, “Luminosity," The Stoikov Lecture in Asian Art, The Herbert F. Johnson Museum, Cornell University
 2017  Lecture, The Print Club of New York, 2017 Presentation Artist
 2001  Lecture, “Painting With Paper," The Japan Society, London England Lecture, “Painting With Paper “, Beatrice Royal Gallery, Eastleigh, England
 1995  Lecture, "Viewpoints," the Memorial Art Gallery of the University of Rochester
 1992  Feature story on Byodoin exhibition,  NHK News, Kyoto, September 22 Byodoin exhibition, NHK News Kansai, September 25  	 
 1990  Lecture, “ Painting  with Liquid Paper," The College Women's Association of Japan, Tokyo. 
 1989  Interview “Catch Up: Tokyo Art Expo,” Marui News, Tokyo, November 
 1988  Museum of Modern Art Shiga exhibition, NHK News, Kansai, November 12, 1988.

See also 

 Washi
 Etching
 Woodblock printing
 Tōshi Yoshida
 Hiroshi Yoshida

References 

Art piece at British Museum 
Artelino.com 
TED Conference Sarah Brayer: 
Japanese Prints at the Verne collection, September 15, 2010: 
Franco, Betsy; Verne, Michael (1997), Quiet Elegance: Japan Through the Eyes of Nine American Artists, Tokyo: Tuttle, 
Japan Times: 
New York Times:

External links 

Japanese Prints at the Verne Collection, September 15, 2010: 
Japan Times: 
New York Times: 
Deep Kyoto Magazine 
Reference at British Museum 
TED Conference:* 
Cultural agency doles out awards to those promoting Japan, The Japan Times, June 6, 2013: 

List of American artists 1900 and after

Living people
1957 births
21st-century American painters
American women painters
21st-century American women artists
20th-century American painters
20th-century American women artists